Packera anonyma, called Appalachian ragwort and Small's ragwort, is a flowering plant in the Asteraceae (aster family).

Distribution and habitat
The perennial herb is native to the lower Northeastern United States and across the Southeastern United States. Regions it is found in include the Appalachian Mountains and the southeastern Great Lakes states. It inhabits rock outcrops, roadsides, woods, and disturbed areas.

Description
Packera anonyma produces abundant yellow flowers in May and early June. It blooms April to May in the South, and early June to mid-July in the North.

References

External links
USDA Plants Profile for Packera anonyma (Small's ragwort, Appalachian ragwort)
Wildflower.org: Packera anonyma
Southeasternflora.com: Packera anonyma

anonyma
Flora of the Northeastern United States
Flora of the Southeastern United States
Flora of the Appalachian Mountains
Flora of the Great Lakes region (North America)
Flora without expected TNC conservation status